The Brussels Conference Act of 1890 (full title: Convention Relative to the Slave Trade and Importation into Africa of Firearms, Ammunition, and Spiritous Liquors) was a collection of anti-slavery measures signed in Brussels on 2 July 1890 (and which entered into force on 31 August 1891) to, as the act itself puts it, "put an end to Negro Slave Trade by land as well as by sea, and to improve the moral and material conditions of existence of the native races". 

The negotiations for this act arose out of the Brussels Anti-Slavery Conference 1889–90. The act was specifically applicable to those countries "who have possessions or Protectorates in the conventional basin of the Congo", to the Ottoman Empire and other powers or parts who were involved in slave trade in East African coast, Indian Ocean and other areas.

For example, Article 21 describes the zone in which measures should be taken, referring to "the coasts of Indian Ocean (including the Persian Gulf and the Red Sea), the Belouchistan up to Tangalane (Quilimane)... " and Madagascar. The Act provided for the establishment of a relevant International Bureau in Zanzibar.

In Art. 68:
"the Powers recognize the high value of the Law on the prohibition of Slave Trafficing of blacks, issued by His Majesty The Emperor of the Ottomans on 4–16 Dec. 1889, and are assured that a surveillance action will be taken by the Ottoman authorities, especially in the western part of Arabia and on the routes that keep that coast in communication with other possessions of His Imperial Majesty in Asia." 
Similar actions were called on to be taken by the Shah of Persia and the Sultan of Zanzibar (Art. 69, 70). The participants also agreed to stop sales of guns and other weapons to Africans.

Participants
The parties to the agreement were:

 
 
 
 
 
 
 
 
 
  Sublime State of Persia

Aftermath
The Brussels Act was supplemented and revised by the Convention of Saint-Germain-en-Laye signed by the Allied Powers of the First World War on 10 September 1919.

Because of its provisions on alcohol, the Act is considered the first treaties on the control of psychoactive substances (preceding the first opium treaty from 1909).

See also
 1926 Slavery Convention
 Supplementary Convention on the Abolition of Slavery
 Slave Trade Acts

References

External links

 Jean Allain, "Fydor Martens and the Question of Slavery at the Brussels Conference".
"Brussels Conference Act, 1890".
General Act of the Brussels Conference relative to the African Slave Trade
Slave trade and importation into Africa of firearms, ammunition and spiritous liquor

1890 in Belgium
Treaties concluded in 1890
19th century in Brussels
Anti-slavery treaties
History of Africa
Treaties entered into force in 1891
Treaties of the United Kingdom (1801–1922)
Treaties of the French Third Republic
Treaties of the German Empire
Treaties of the Kingdom of Portugal
Treaties of the Congo Free State
Treaties of the Kingdom of Italy (1861–1946)
Treaties of Spain under the Restoration
Treaties of the Netherlands
Treaties of Belgium
Treaties of the Russian Empire
Treaties of Austria-Hungary
Treaties of the United Kingdoms of Sweden and Norway
Treaties of Denmark
Treaties of the United States
Treaties of the Ottoman Empire
Treaties of the Sultanate of Zanzibar
Treaties of the Qajar dynasty
July 1890 events
Slavery in the Ottoman Empire
Drug control treaties